Go Fish Pictures was an American film production and distribution company and a division of DreamWorks SKG, The company was founded in 2000 in order to produce and release arthouse, independent and foreign films. The division was initially successful with the anime films Millennium Actress and Ghost in the Shell 2: Innocence in 2003 and 2004 respectively. This led to venturing into live-action films with the releases of The Chumscrubber and The Prize Winner of Defiance, Ohio.

However, following the critical and commercial failure of Chumscrubber, DreamWorks shut down the division in 2007 shortly after the release of the Japanese film Casshern.

Films

References

External links

DreamWorks Pictures
Entertainment companies established in 2000
Entertainment companies disestablished in 2007
Film distributors of the United States
2000 establishments in California
Companies based in Los Angeles County, California
Entertainment companies based in California

Paramount Pictures
Former Viacom subsidiaries
Universal Pictures
Amblin Partners